The fifth season of The Voice began on 1 May 2016. Jessie J, Delta Goodrem and The Madden Brothers returned as coaches with Ronan Keating replacing Ricky Martin. Sonia Kruger became solo host of the season after Darren McMullen left the series.

Alfie Arcuri from Team Delta won the competition, marking Goodrem's first victory as a coach and the second female coach after Jessie J to win a season.  Adam Ladell, also from Team Delta, finished as runner-up, while Tash Lockhart and Ellen Reed finished in third and fourth place, respectively.

This was the only season to feature Ronan Keating; as well as the last to feature The Madden Brothers and Jessie J as coaches. This was also the first season in which the first auditionee (Alfie Arcuri) won the series.

Teams
Color key

Blind auditions 

Color key

Episode 1 (1 May) 
The coaches performed a cover of "Hello" together at the start of the show.

Episode 2 (2 May)

Episode 3 (3 May)

Episode 4 (9 May) 

Casey Rose originally was a duo with Barnaby, however, the coaches told her that she is better off alone. They gave them the decision to split and become a solo or continue as a duet with Barnaby and be eliminated in the battles. They chose to split however, Casey was still eliminated in the battles

Episode 5 (10 May)

Episode 6 (15 May)

Episode 7 (16 May)

Episode 8 (22 May)

Episode 9 (23 May)

Battle rounds 
Color key

Episode 10 (29 May)
The first episode of the Battle Rounds was first broadcast on 29 May 2016. The coaches opened the show performing a cover of "One Way or Another (Teenage Kicks)" together.

Episode 11 (30 May)
The second episode of the Battle Rounds was first broadcast on 30 May 2016.

Finding it difficult to choose a battle winner between Nada-Leigh and Jasmin Jade, Jessie J chose both of them to advance as a duo with approval from the producers.

Episode 12 (5 June)
The third episode of the Battle Rounds will be broadcast on 5 June 2016.

Super Battle round 
Each coach splits their team into two groups of four. Those four artists then take to the stage together and each perform a different song in a head-to-head duel. Two go through to the Live Shows, while two are eliminated, with no saves available. Plus, the songs in each Super Battle have a theme picked by the coaches.

Color key

Episode 13 (6 June)
The Super Battle round was first broadcast on 6 June 2016.

The Super Battles

The Live Shows

Episode 14 (13 June)

The first episode of the Live shows was first broadcast on 13 June 2016. Each of the coach's four artists performed a song. Each coach then saved one of their artists, guaranteeing them a performance in the second live show. The remaining artists faced the public vote all week. Then, the artist with the fewest votes from each team was eliminated during Live Show two before they got a chance to perform.

Episode 15 (19 June)

The second episode of the Live shows was first broadcast on 19 June 2016.

Episode 16 (26 June)
The third episode of the Live shows was first broadcast on 26 June 2016. Due to a pre-commitment The Madden Brothers had with their band Good Charlotte, Australian sister band The Veronicas filled in as judges in their place for this episode and also performed their new single "In My Blood".

The Semi-Finals
The Semi-Finals was broadcast on 3 July 2016.
At the beginning of the show, the four artists with the most votes (one per team) were fast tracked to the second half of the show, the four artists with the fewest votes (one per team) performed to stay in the competition. Only two made it through on an instant app vote mid-show to join the top four artists, giving us the top six. The top six performed their Semi-Final song, followed by another instant app vote, and from there the top four were announced and advanced to The Grand Finale. Coach Delta Goodrem performed her new single "Enough" featuring Gizzle.

With the elimination of Andrew Loadsman, The Maddens had no more contestants left on their team, making this the second season in the Australian version of the franchise where a coach did not have a contestant in the grand finale.

Grand Finale
The Grand Finale was first broadcast on 10 July 2016. The Madden Brothers' band Good Charlotte performed their single "Life Can't Get Much Better" and girl band Fifth Harmony performed their single "All in My Head (Flex)".

With Alfie Arcuri and Adam Ladell being Winner and Runner-up, respectively, Delta Goodrem became the first coach in the Australian version of the franchise to have two of her artists as Top 2.

Live Shows Elimination Chart

Overall

Artist's info

Result details

Team

Result details

Ratings

Trivia
Alfie Arcuri and Ellen Reed were the first and last televised auditioners that year, and both managed to advance to the final four.

References

5
2016 Australian television seasons